Watch Out is Lovex's album released by EMI in Germany, the biggest music market in Europe. Album consist of ten songs which are written by: Christian, Theon, Vivian Sin'amor, M. Kaxe and Sammy Black. They have some new style of lyrics and playing. They also recorded new videos for songs: "U.S.A" and "Slave For The Glory". In "The Mill Sessions" they were performing "Marble Walls" and "Slave For The Glory".

Track listing

Japanese edition bonus tracks

References

Lovex albums
EMI Records albums
2011 albums